Sony Vaio FW is a discontinued series of notebook computers which were the first laptops ever to have a 1080p 16.4" 16:9 widescreen LCD. Higher end models in the series can support an integral Blu-ray Disc reader or writer. The laptop weighed 3.1 kg. The battery lasts up to two hours. In June 2009, the ATI Mobility Radeon HD 3650 was replaced by the ATI Mobility Radeon HD 4650 with the release of the FW 4xx series. Additionally, Sony also released a special model of this series apart from the signature series models (Model:VGN-FW590FFD). This model had a futuristic themed cover and came equipped with moderately high-end specifications for $1069.99 U.S. dollars. The VGN-FW590FFD model was also only available for purchase through Sony Style's website.

 Processor: Intel Core 2 Duo  
 Color: Black, Chocolate Brown, Nebula, Silver
 Memory: 2, 3, 4, 6, or 8 GB of DDR2 SDRAM @ 800 MHz
 Hard Drive: 160, 250, 320, 400, or 500 GB SATA Hard Disk Drive @ 5400 RPM, 320 GB SATA Hard Disk Drive @ 7,200 RPM, 128 GB Solid State Drive
 Optical Disc Drive: CD/DVD reader/writer, Blu-ray Disc reader, or Blu-ray Disc reader/writer
 Graphics: ATI Mobility Radeon HD 3470 with 256 MB of vRAM, ATI Mobility Radeon HD 4650 with 512 MB of vRAM, or  ATI Mobility Radeon HD 4650 w/1 GB of vRAM
 Display: 16.4" XBRITE-ECO with 1600 × 900 resolution, or 16.4" HiColor-FullHD w/1920 × 1080 resolution, or 16.4" XBRITE-FullHD w/1920 × 1080 resolution
 Extras: SD and magic gate pro card reader, 3 USB 2.0 slots, i.LINK IEEE 1394 slot and a HDMI cable slot

References

External links 
 

FW